Isharwal is a village located in the Jalandhar district of Punjab, India. The total population of the village is about 1,227.

References

Villages in Jalandhar district